Judgement 8 was a professional wrestling event promoted by DDT Pro-Wrestling (DDT). It took place on March 20, 2004, in Tokyo, Japan, at the Velfarre discothèque. It was the seventh event under the Judgement name. The event aired domestically on Fighting TV Samurai.

Storylines
Judgement 8 featured seven professional wrestling matches that involved different wrestlers from pre-existing scripted feuds and storylines. Wrestlers portrayed villains, heroes, or less distinguishable characters in the scripted events that built tension and culminated in a wrestling match or series of matches.

Event

Results

References

External links
The official DDT Pro-Wrestling website

8
2004 in professional wrestling
Professional wrestling in Tokyo